John D. Little Jr.  (May 3, 1947 –  July 9, 1997) was an American football defensive end who played in the National Football League (NFL) for the New York Jets, the Houston Oilers, and the Buffalo Bills. Little played college football at Oklahoma State University.

References

External links
 

1947 births
1997 deaths
American football defensive ends
Buffalo Bills players
Houston Oilers players
New York Jets players
Oklahoma State Cowboys football players
People from Tallulah, Louisiana
Sportspeople from Hot Springs, Arkansas
Players of American football from Arkansas